Spider-Man is a vertical scrolling action game written by Laura Nikolich for the Atari 2600, and released in 1982 by Parker Brothers. It was both the first video game to feature Spider-Man and the first Marvel Comics based video game.

Plot
Norman Osborn has been removed of the Goblin formula and incarcerated by Spider-Man. He manages to cause a prison riot, which breaks him out, and decides to blow up the Empire State Building. Spider-Man catches wind of this, and decides to stop Goblin from using his new creation, a “Superbomb”, to blow up the building. Along the way, he must contend with Goblin’s group of hired thugs, and, ultimately, Goblin himself.

Gameplay

The player controls Spider-Man, who is attempting to scale a building and defuse bombs planted by the Green Goblin. Spider-Man is only able to use his web lines to move up the building either vertically or diagonally. Generic criminals dwell along the many floors of the building, moving randomly from one window to another. Spider-Man counts with limited web fluid to achieve his goal, indicated by a meter at the bottom of the screen. The web fluid meter slowly depletes as time passes, acting like a time limiter of sorts. If the meter depletes completely, Spider-Man will plummet to the ground with no means of saving himself and a life will be lost. If the player has no lives left, the game will be over.

Spider-Man can replenish a little amount of web fluid for each captured criminal or for each small bomb defused. To capture a criminal, Spider-Man must make physical contact with them. However, if a criminal manages to touch his web line, they will cut it and send Spidey plummeting below, though the player can shoot another web in time to save himself.

Near the top of each building, the layout changes to a series of girders where the Goblin has planted many small bombs to hinder Spidey's progress. When a bomb is about to explode, it will change its color from black to red. Defusing a red bomb yields more points than a black one.

Upon reaching the top of the building, Spidey must then face off against the Goblin, who has planted a "super bomb", whose fuse is activated upon defeating a certain number of enemies and/or defusing a certain number of small bombs. Once the fuse is lit, there is a limited time to reach the super bomb before it detonates, claiming one of Spidey's lives. Upon defeating the Goblin (which involves simply avoiding him) and defusing his super bomb, the game starts over at the next level, which may feature faster-moving and/or more instances of the Green Goblin, taller buildings, taller scaffold sections or a quicker-depleting supply of web  fluid. The building is sometimes a different color.

Reception
Mark Trost of Electronic Fun with Computers & Games reviewed the game in February 1983, rating it 3 out of 4. He criticized it for being derivative of the 1980 arcade video game Crazy Climber, but said it was a "nice variation on the theme" with web shooting and swinging abilities, and called it "a challenging, graphically acceptable and ultimately engrossing" game.

References

External links
Spider-Man at Atari Mania

1982 video games
Atari 2600 games
Atari 2600-only games
Multiplayer and single-player video games
Parker Brothers video games
Superhero video games
Video games about bomb disposal
Video games based on Spider-Man
Video games developed in the United States
Video games set in New York City